Zijin may refer to:

Zijin County, Guangdong
Zijin, Hubei, town in Gucheng County
Zijin Mountain, or Purple Mountain, in eastern Nanjing
Zijin Mining, a gold mining enterprise in Fujian